The Addams Family is a platform game based on the 1991 film of the same name and developed and published by Ocean Software. It was released for home consoles such as the Super Nintendo Entertainment System, computers such as the Amiga, and handheld consoles like the Game Boy.

The game has the player control Gomez Addams. His mission is to rescue other members of the Addams family from the clutches of Abigail Craven, who, alongside The Judge and the family attorney Tully Alford, is trying to seize the Addams' wealth. The game is non-linear, with players moving throughout the mansion's many inside and outside areas, some of which are hidden. Opponents include bosses each holding a member of the Addams Family hostage, making them necessary to defeat. Power-ups, extra lives, and money are also collectable.

Ocean, a leader in the market of video game adaptations of film in the late 1980s, began development of the tie-in for The Addams Family film in April 1991, before the film switched studios from 20th Century Fox to Paramount Pictures. It was originally planned to be a puzzle video game released only on computer consoles. However, that changed when Ocean was called by the studio to develop a version for the SNES. The final result was that all versions, including the computer versions, were platformers with the same storyline, setting and objective. The game was critically well-received for its graphics, sound, and music, but also was widely considered to be a derivative platformer of its time.

Gameplay and plot 

The Addams Family is a side-scrolling action-adventure platform game. The story involves Abigail Craven scheming to obtain The Addams Family's secret wealth. To do this, she brainwashes Uncle Fester, who has just lost his memory, into being an ally, and is also aided by The Judge and the Addams' family attorney, Tully Alford, who takes control of the mansion. Morticia Addams, Pugsley Addams, Wednesday Addams, and Granny go to the house to meet with Tully about the property, only to be kidnapped within it by Abigail. When Gomez Addams gets home, he finds the other family members gone. To save his family, Gomez runs, jumps, and squats his way throughout the large mansion invested with ghosts, mutants, monsters, bats and rabbits, as well as stage hazards like stars, swinging clock pendulums, and fire lakes.

Puzzle-solving is also involved in saving the Addams family members. For example, Wednesday is found in an ice-themed freezing area and it is up to the player to figure out how to thaw her out, and Granny is trapped in a stove that's turned off by a switch the player must find. The Amstrad CPC game has many doors that can only be unlocked by keys hidden throughout the mansion. In most versions, the underground chambers must be activated to save Morticia; Lurch plays a tune in the Music Room that activates it, but only when Wednesday, Pugsley, Granny and Uncle Fester are rescued and meet up in the room. In the NES version, Gomez has to collect $1,000,000 to save Morticia. The Judge is the game's final boss.

The Addams Family is similar to open-ended titles such as The Legend of Zelda (1986) and Super Metroid (1994), as the player has the freedom to maneuver both the indoor and outdoor areas of the mansion in any order. The core of the game is in the mansion's Hall of Stairs, consisting of the front entrance and six doorways. Rooms these doors lead to include the kitchen, the games room, and the portrait gallery, and each feature around 40–50 screens. A boss, a huge bird, is located in the outside garden. One of the doors near the front is invisible and leads to Pugsley's Den, which has power-ups, money, and five 1-UPs; it also has another secret area within it containing 27 lives. Throughout the mansion, there are bonus areas holding extra lives and money, as well as unnoticeable spots in non-secret areas containing the same. There are also boxes where Thing provides clues, such as how objects in a room work and where to go next.

Similar to Mario games, Gomez kills enemies and bosses by stomping on them, and collects power-ups and coins. Power-ups include a sword, a golf club that can shoot balls in a similar fashion to fire flowers, the fezi-copter hat that makes Gomez fly, and shoes that increases his speed. All of these can be held from door-to-door except for the fezi-copter, which disintegrates by the time Gomez enters a door. The Game Boy version additionally has four collectible potions, left around by Pugsley, that are needed to access certain areas. The Wolfman potion increases his speed, Frankie gives him invincibility that lasts for 10 hits with enemies, Sea Monster enables him to swim underwater, and Drac makes him fly. Also only in the Game Boy release, power-up items are limited in energy, meaning power vials must be collected to keep them in use.

In some versions, Gomez' maximum health is represented by heart containers, starting with two. Up to three additional heart containers, as well extra lives, can be collected. Collecting $25 fills one of the containers ($50 in the Amiga version), and $100 gives the player a 1-UP. The player also has unlimited continues, although is put back at the Hall of Stairs once all the lives are lost. A password is earned after defeating a boss, which also rewards the player with either one of the Addams family members or a heart container. The NES, Game Boy, and CPC releases uses different representations of health. The NES version has a regular life bar, while the Game Boy and CPC version uses a system with a consistent amount of hearts.

In the CPC version, Gomez has to survive in a screen for 60 seconds after he finds an Addams.

Development 
In the late 1980s, British developer Ocean Software gained a reputation for being the leader, and go-to producer, of game tie-ins for computers and consoles, such as RoboCop (1988), Batman (1989), Total Recall (1990), RoboCop 3 (1991), and Hudson Hawk (1991). In April 1991, they started development on a tie-in for an upcoming film based on the fictional cartoon family The Addams Family; this was before the project switched studios from 20th Century Fox to Paramount Pictures. The game was first announced by ACE magazine in June 1991. Near the release of the movie, film industry journalist David J. Fox reported a widespread trend of video game tie-ins for major film projects. He attributed this to studios looking for other sources of income and promotional methods to make up for a rising decline in theater attendance. Nintendo, in 1990, reported customers spending $2.4 billion on video games, nearly half of the $5 billion spent on movie tickets the same year. The Addams Familys business plan was different from most others in that the game was released a month after the film. Just one other project around the same time had a similar strategy, Steven Spielberg's Hook, its video game published by Sony Imagesoft.

The team consisted of James Higgins as coder, Warren Lancashire for game design and graphics, Simon Butler for additional graphics, and Jonathan Dunn for music. Ocean only had the script to work with throughout development. Because most of the story was dictated by character dialogue, it was tough to incorporate it into a video game; they ultimately chose to base the game on the film's last 20 minutes. Described Higgins, it was natural that the game starring a gothic family would have horror fiction tropes such as skulls and ghosts as enemies; however, Butler's surreal sense led to the creation of enemies like the flying teacups and tricycle-riding frogs.

The Addams Family was initially planned to be a puzzle video game released only on computer systems, but within two weeks of development, Paramount called Ocean asking to create a port of the game on the SNES. After finishing the SNES version in November 1991, they went back to the code for the computer version and, with a console-game-influenced viewpoint, disliked it to the point of rejecting it. They found it had too little graphical colorfulness, too slow of a frame rate and no parallax scrolling. Additionally, with a lack of "console-style" products released on systems like the Amiga, Ocean had wanted to be the first company to develop and release a 16-bit computer game that was a Mario-esque platformer well before the game's development began. Thus, they made the computer ports identical to those of the console releases, "arcadey" platformers with pickup items, extra lives, level warps, secret areas, and bonuses. Two other console-type platform games would be released on computers around the same time as The Addams Family: Fire and Ice and James Pond 2: Codename: RoboCod. Thus, reviews of 16-bit computer versions of The Addams Family constantly brought up those two titles.

Reception 

The most common claim about The Addams Family was that it was good in terms of gameplay, graphics and sound, but offered nothing special or original to the platform genre. Total! journalist Andy, reviewing the NES version, opined that even considering it was a typical platformer, it was disappointing for an Ocean game given the standard set by their NES adaptation of Hook. Reviews of the Mega Drive port published in 1994, such as those from Computer and Video Games and Hyper, found it especially out-of-date given the amount of more innovative platformers already in existence, such as James Pond 3 (1993) and the Sonic games. Ed Ricketts, in addition to viewing the game as "slick, bland, well-programmed, large, not too difficult", and a "decent effort", was bothered by its poor utilization of the Addams Family license, finding the sprites and special mannerisms of the Addams characters only bearing a slight resemblance.

Michael Foster disagreed that The Addams Family was a clone of other platform games, feeling it had "a lot of variety, and it's complex without being impossible". Reviews also felt its level design had enough thrilling elements to keep the player's attention, such as funny enemy sprites, hidden areas, creative power-ups, and a constant barrage of foes. Jonathan Davies, a journalist for Super Play, called it one of the best-looking and most imaginative SNES titles. Other critics outside the lukewarm consensus included Amiga Actions Brian Sharp who called The Addams Family one of the top three video game adaptations of films, Amiga Computings Jonathan Maddock that called it one of the Amiga best platform games, and a reviewer for Joystick that claimed it the best platformer on the Atari ST. On the other end of the spectrum, Mega magazine's Andy Dyer dismissed The Addams Family as a "complete non-event" with uninspiring graphics, repetitive level design, and enemies that irritate rather than tests the player.

Of frequent discussion was the high difficulty. Rod Lawton of Amstrad Action reported the CPC port being filled with brutal timing puzzles and constantly respawning enemies. Aktueller Software Markt journalist Hans-Joachim Amann wrote that lives can run out very fast, to the point where it was still hard even if the player had more than ten lives. Reviews noted the game's large amount of areas to traverse and master, praising how they contributed to the challenge level and lastability. Amiga Computings Jonathan Maddock suspected it was larger than any other Amiga title. Both Andy and Nintendo Life journalist Jamie O'Neill wrote that figuring out which actions to take, such as the right order of areas to traverse, was a major key to success. O'Neill that the freedom in moving around the very large mansion fools the player into thinking progress is being made. Opined Rob of Mean Machines wrote that "there are always new rooms, passages and puzzles to solve, and the password systems ensures that your efforts are pursued". Davies, however, felt the open-ended-ness robbed The Addams Family of being similar to Mario in terms of addictiveness; whereas the player would feel increasingly satisfied by beating more and more levels, that same sense of progress would not be in a title where the player can go wherever he likes. While some reviewers found the controls responsive and easy to use, others were critical of how slippery Gomez was, and also criticized the collision detection for being imperfect and too harsh on the player. Ricketts, covering the Atari ST port, was ticked off by the "fire" button being for jumping, reasoning it went against players' instinct.

Sharp called the graphics "humorous and a joy to watch on screen". A common positive was the game's background, specifically their amount of detail, color, and the diversity of backgrounds. Sharp and O'Neill noted the smooth parallax scrolling. Computer and Video Games writer Garth Sumpter highlighted the pictures of the Family in the hallway and the use of beer-rugs and armour suits as hazards. The sprites were also spotlighted for their animation and cute style. Reviewers appreciated the game's upbeat music, such as O'Neill who also highlighted the bass parts in the SNES version. Maddock was surprised by how uncannily the Amiga executed the Addams Family theme, but the Amiga version's rejection of backgrounds in the SNES version, which the Amiga didn't have the speed to handle parallax scrolling, garnered a mixed response. Amiga Formats Neil West felt it detached the game of atmosphere, while it was easier to see sprites without the backdrops for Maddock.

Reviews of the game on 8-bit consoles were less favorable, common complaints being the lack of gameplay depth, challenge, and average visuals and audio. GamePro journalist The Spam Weasal claimed the NES version had some of the worst music for the console, arguing it was just the theme playing over and over again. Lar of Aktueller Software Markt was bored by the Game Boy game, describing the experience as endlessly hopping on platforms. He also condemned the lack of effort put in the backgrounds, the useless weapons, and the limited available health. Total! magazine's Andy found the Game Boy version inferior to the NES release. He felt there was legitimate challenge in both 8-bit ports in that the player has to be cautious of where to go and what actions to take, especially the Game Boy version for its small amount of fuel for the power-ups and their requirement for defeating bosses. However, he thought the Game Boy port was "a little too empty" to engage gamers, describing it as wandering around a big location for a long time, and reported rescuing three Addams family members and collecting half of the required items in a single playthrough. He also disliked the Game Boy version's imprecise shooting and "fairly awful" music, and called the NES rendition of the theme "naff" and "warbly". ACEs Gary White, although more positive towards the Game Boy port, reported an overwhelming amount of enemies being thrown at the player the instant the game began, making it difficult for novice players to adjust themselves to it. He was also annoyed by Gomez' "strangely restrained" jumps and the overabundance of platforms.

Notes

References

External links

1992 video games
The Addams Family video games
Video games based on adaptations
Amiga games
Amstrad CPC games
Atari ST games
Commodore 64 games
Game Boy games
Game Gear games
Nintendo Entertainment System games
Master System games
Ocean Software games
Platform games
Sega Genesis games
Super Nintendo Entertainment System games
ZX Spectrum games
Video games based on films
Video games scored by Barry Leitch
Video games scored by Mark Cooksey
Video games developed in the United Kingdom
Single-player video games
Tiger Electronics handheld games